Černá Voda is a municipality and village in Jeseník District in the Olomouc Region of the Czech Republic. It has about 500 inhabitants.

References

Villages in Jeseník District
Czech Silesia